Stonewall County is a county located in the U.S. state of Texas. As of the 2020 census, its population was 1,245. Its county seat is Aspermont. The county was created in 1876 and organized in 1888. It is named for Stonewall Jackson, a general of the Confederate States Army.

Republican Drew Springer, Jr., a businessman from Muenster in Cooke County, represented Stonewall County in the Texas House of Representatives from January 2013, and as of January 2021, represents District 30 in the Texas Senate.

History
Stonewall County was formed in 1876 from the Young Territory. It was initially attached to Young County, Throckmorton County, and then Jones County, before finally becoming fully organized in 1889.

Geography

Geographic features
 Double Mountain (county high point and most topographically prominent point for almost 

Major highways
  U.S. Highway 83
  U.S. Highway 380
  State Highway 283

Adjacent counties
 King County (north)
 Haskell County (east)
 Jones County (southeast)
 Fisher County (south)
 Kent County (west)

Demographics

Note: the US Census treats Hispanic/Latino as an ethnic category. This table excludes Latinos from the racial categories and assigns them to a separate category. Hispanics/Latinos can be of any race.

As of the census of 2010,  1,490 people, 642 households, and 426 families resided in the county.  The population density was 2.0 people per square mile.  The 928 housing units averaged 1 per square mile.  The racial makeup of the county was 87.7% White, 2.6% Black or African American, 0.5% Native American, 0.9% Asian, 6.3% from other races, and 1.9% from two or more races.  About 14.0% of the population was Hispanic or Latino of any race.

Of the 642 households, 24% had children under the age of 18 living with them, 53% were married couples living together, 10.1% had a female householder with no husband present, and 33.6% were not families; 15.7% had someone living alone who was 65 years of age or older.  The average household size was 2.28 and the average family size was 2.83.

In the county, the population was distributed as 22.80% under the age of 18, 6.20% from 18 to 24, 22.60% from 25 to 44, 24.50% from 45 to 64, and 24.00% who were 65 years of age or older.  The median age was 44 years. For every 100 females, there were 90.00 males.  For every 100 females age 18 and over, there were 91.10 males.

The median income for a household in the county was $27,935, and for a family was $35,571. Males had a median income of $27,083 versus $15,000 for females. The per capita income for the county was $16,094.  About 14.80% of families and 19.30% of the population were below the poverty line, including 31.50% of those under age 18 and 14.50% of those age 65 or over.

Communities

Town
 Aspermont (county seat)

Unincorporated communities
 Old Glory
 Peacock
 Swenson

Ghost town
 Rath City

Politics
Whereas the counties to its north in the Panhandle proper became overwhelmingly Republican at the presidential level with Dwight D. Eisenhower in the 1950s, Stonewall County continued to favor the Democratic Party for another four decades, even being narrowly won by Walter Mondale in 1984 when he came within 3,819 votes of losing all fifty states. During the twentieth century the only Republican to carry Stonewall County was Richard Nixon in 1972 – it was one of the few Baptist Bible Belt counties that stayed loyal to the anti-Prohibition Catholic Al Smith in 1928 when Texas voted Republican for the first time in its history.

Like the rest of the Bible Belt, due to opposition to the Democratic Party's liberal positions on social issues Stonewall County has trended powerfully Republican and in the last five elections the Republican nominee has won more than 62 percent of the vote – more than Nixon won in his 3,000-plus-county landslide in 1972.

References

External links
 
 Stonewall County extension profile at Texas A&M University
 Stonewall County Profile from the Texas Association of Counties 

 
1888 establishments in Texas
Populated places established in 1888